Avira Rebecca is an Indian filmmaker, and script writer. He is most known for his award-winning debut art-house film titled Thakarachenda, and got the Kerala State Film Award for Best Debut Director for the film.

Films

References

External links

Malayalam screenwriters
Indian art directors
Living people
Year of birth missing (living people)